Chār Qala (meaning Four Castles), also known as Char Qala-e Wazirabad, is a neighbourhood in northern Kabul, Afghanistan, forming part of the city's Police District 10. Chār Qala is a densely populated slum area located to the north of the wealthy Wazir Akbar Khan.

See also 
 Kabul

Source 

Neighborhoods of Kabul